Nse Ikpe-Etim  (born 21 October 1974) is a Nigerian actress. She came into prominence in 2008 for her role in Reloaded. She was nominated for Best Actress in a Leading Role at the 5th and 8th Africa Movie Academy Awards for her role in Reloaded and Mr. and Mrs., respectively. In 2014, she won the Best Actress in a Drama award at the 2014 Africa Magic Viewers Choice Awards for playing "Nse" in Journey to Self. She made mention of not being ashamed of her inability to get pregnant.

Early life

Etim was born on 21 October 1974 in Lagos. Etim attended Awa Nursery School and Command Primary School in Kaduna State, from where she then furthered her studies at Louis College, Jos, and the Federal Government Colleges in Jos and Ilorin. She said that her family was often transferred to various regions of Nigeria due to her father's career with the Central Bank of Nigeria. Etim got her first degree in Theater Arts from the University of Calabar.

Personal life
Etim is the first of six children. In an interview with Toolz, she stated that she's had Caucasian Godparents. She married her childhood friend Clifford Sule on 14 February 2013 at a Lagos registry. A traditional wedding ceremony followed in her hometown in Akwa Ibom State and Lagos State, respectively, some months after the civil union. She currently resides in London with her husband, a senior lecturer at Middlesex University  who frequents Nigeria for film engagements.

On Friday March 20, 2020, she posted on her Instagram page that she had just returned from the United Kingdom, one of the most hit places by COVID-19, according to the Federal Ministry of Health. She however followed the directives of Nigeria Center for Disease Control(NCDC) to be self-isolated. She received support from colleagues such as Rita Dominic, Chika Ike, Iyabo Ojo amongst others.

Career
At 18, Etim started acting on stage at the university. Her first television appearance was in the family soap Inheritance. After her graduation from university, she temporarily left the film industry to venture into other endeavors before making a comeback with Emem Isong's Reloaded alongside Ramsey Nouah, Rita Dominic, Ini Edo and Desmond Elliot.

In December 2019, Nse Etim was featured in the Visual Collaborative Polaris catalogue, under the Supernova series for humanities, she was interviewed alongside people such as: William Coupon, Bisila Bokoko and Ade Adekola.

In 2020, she was in the cast of Quam's Money which is a follow-up to the 2018 film New Money directed by Tope Oshin. The follow-up story follows what happens when a security guard (Quam) suddenly becomes a multi-millionaire. The new cast was led by Falz, Toni Tones, Jemima Osunde, Blossom Chukwujekwu and Nse Ikpe-Etim.

February 2021 however had her playing in the lead role alongside Richard Mofe-Damijo and Zainab Balogun in Seyi Babatope movie direction, Fine Wine

Filmography

Awards and nominations

References

External links 
 

Nigerian stage actresses
Nigerian film actresses
Living people
Actresses from Akwa Ibom State
21st-century Nigerian actresses
University of Calabar alumni
Nigerian expatriates in the United Kingdom
1974 births
People from Akwa Ibom State
Nigerian film award winners